The George Schueler House is a historic home in Sarasota, Florida. It is located at 76 South Washington Drive. On September 26, 1997, it was added to the U.S. National Register of Historic Places.

References

External links
 Sarasota County listings at National Register of Historic Places
 George Schueler House at Portal of Historic Resources, State of Florida

Houses in Sarasota, Florida
Houses on the National Register of Historic Places in Sarasota County, Florida
Houses completed in 1926
Mediterranean Revival architecture in Florida